The 1989 Chicago Marathon was the 12th running of the annual marathon race in Chicago, United States and was held on October 29. The elite men's race was won by Britain's Paul Davies-Hale in a time of 2:11:25 hours and the women's race was won by America's Lisa Rainsberger in 2:28:15. A total of 5635 runners finished the race.

Results

Men

Women

References

Results. Association of Road Racing Statisticians. Retrieved 2020-05-25.

External links 
 Official website

Chicago Marathon
Chicago
1980s in Chicago
1989 in Illinois
Chicago Marathon
Chicago Marathon